KISD may refer to:

 Köln International School of Design in Cologne, Germany
 KISD (FM), a radio station (98.7 FM) licensed to Pipestone, Minnesota, United States
 Independent School Districts in Texas - K
 Kent Intermediate School District, an intermediate school district in Kent County, Michigan, United States